Henry Symons Bishop (15 December 1849 – 18 July 1891) was a cricketer who played one first class match for Victoria.

References

Victoria cricketers
1849 births
1891 deaths
Australian cricketers
People from Great Torrington
English emigrants to Australia